Larry is a masculine given name in English, derived from Lawrence or Laurence. It can be a shortened form of those names.

Larry may refer to the following:

People

Arts and entertainment
Larry D. Alexander, American artist/writer
Larry Boone, American country singer
 Larry Collins, American musician, member of the rockabilly sibling duo The Collins Kids
Larry David (born 1947), Emmy-winning American actor, writer, comedian, producer and film director
Larry Emdur, Australian TV host
Larry Feign, American cartoonist working in Hong Kong
Larry Fine, of the Three Stooges
Larry Gates, American actor
Larry Gatlin, American country singer
Larry Gelbart (1928–2009), American screenwriter, playwright, director and author
Larry Graham, founder of American funk band Graham Central Station
Larry Hagman, American actor, best known for the TV series I Dream of Jeannie and Dallas
Larry Henley (1937–2014), American singer and songwriter, member of The Newbeats
Larry Hovis, American actor and singer
Larry June , American rapper
Larry Junstrom (1949–2019), American bassist, founding member of the rock band Lynyrd Skynyrd
Larry Kenney, American radio DJ and voice actor on Imus in the Morning
Larry King, American talk show host of Larry King Live on CNN
Larry Knechtel (1940–2009), American keyboardist and bassist
Larry Lavender, American dancer and scholar
Larry Lujack (1940–2013), American radio disc jockey
Larry Mathews, Irish musician
Larry McMurtry, American novelist
Larry Miller, American actor and stand-up comedian
Larry Mullen Jr., Irish drummer and founder of the group U2
Larry Niven, American science fiction author
 Hilario Larry Ramos (1942–2014), American musician, member of the band the Association
 Larry Sanders (born 1954), American singer aka L.V. 
Larry Storch (1923–2022), American actor and comedian, best known for his TV work in F Troop
Larry Taylor (1942–2019), American bassist, member of the rock band Canned Heat
Larry Verne (1936–2013), American singer
Larry Wallis (1949–2019), English rock guitarist and songwriter, early member of the rock band Motörhead
Larry Walters (1949–1993) American truck driver, also known as Lawn Chair Larry
Larry Wilmore, American political satirist, and host of The Nightly Show with Larry Wilmore
Larry the Cable Guy, stage name of American comedian Daniel Lawrence Whitney
Larry (cartoonist), British cartoonist

Information technology
Larry Ellison, co-founder of Oracle Corporation
Larry Page, co-founder of Google
Larry Sanger, co-founder of Wikipedia
Larry Wall, creator of the Perl computer language

Politics
Larry Craig, former US senator from Idaho
Larry C. Johnson, former CIA intelligence officer and political commentator
Larry Kelly (born c. 1935), American politician
M. Larry Lawrence, U.S. Ambassador to Switzerland
Larry Sanders (politician) (born 1934), American-born British academic, social worker and Green Party activist, brother of Bernie Sanders

Sports

Baseball
Larry Andersen, former baseball pitcher
Larry Anderson (baseball), former baseball pitcher for the Brewers White Sox
Larry Bowa, former shortstop for Phillies, Mets, and Cubs and former manager for Padres and Phillies
Larry Brown (infielder), major league infielder in the 1970s and 1980s, mainly with the Cleveland Indians
Larry Doby, first black baseball player in American League
Larry Hisle, major league outfielder with Philadelphia Phillies, Brewers, and Twins
Larry Jackson, major league pitcher in the 1950s and 1960s for the Cardinals, Cubs and Phillies
 Larry Chipper Jones, Atlanta Braves third baseman-outfielder
Larry Sherry, Los Angeles Dodgers pitcher
Larry Walker, former major league outfielder

Basketball
Larry Bird, American Hall-of-Fame National Basketball Association player
Larry Brown (basketball) (born 1940), American Hall-of-Fame basketball All-Star player and coach
Larry Drew (born 1958), American basketball player and coach
Larry Drew II (born 1990), American basketball player 
Larry Gordon, American basketball player
Larry Hollyfield (born 1950/1951), American basketball player
Larry Hughes, US basketball player
Larry Johnson (basketball, born 1969), former US basketball player
Larry Nance, former National Basketball Association player
Larry Riley (basketball), General Manager of the Golden State Warriors
Larry Sanders (basketball) (born 1988), American former National Basketball Association player
Larry Shyatt, American basketball coach

Ice hockey
Larry Huras, NHL ice hockey player and coach
Larry Murphy (ice hockey), NHL ice hockey player
Larry Robinson Canadian NHL ice hockey player
Larry Zeidel, Canadian NHL ice hockey player

Gridiron football
Larry Allen, American football player
Larry Barretta, American football player
Larry Beil (American football), American football player
Larry Borom (born 1999), American football player
Larry Critchfield, American football player
Larry Csonka, American football player
Larry Dick, American football player
Larry Fitzgerald, American football player
Larry Ford (American football), American football player
Larry Johnson (running back), American football player
Larry Jusdanis, Canadian football player
Larry Keller, American football player
Larry Linne, American football player
Larry Ogunjobi, American football player
Larry Peace, American football player
Larry Rentz, American football player
Larry Rose III, American football player
Larry Rountree III (born 1998), American football player
Larry Seivers, American football player
Larry Sherrer, American football player
Larry Steinbach, American football player
Larry Walbridge, American football player

Other sports
Larry Holmes, boxer
Larry L'Estrange MBE, Irish rugby player
Larry Mann (1930–1952), American racing driver
Larry Nixon (born 1950), American professional fisherman
Larry Olsen (jockey), retired jockey
Larry Zbyszko, professional wrestler and commentator

Criminals
Larry Gene Ashbrook, mass murderer
Larry Gene Bell, murderer and possible serial killer
Larry Eyler, serial killer and kidnapper
Larry Dewayne Hall (born 1962), American murderer, rapist, and possible serial killer
Larry Hoover, gang leader
Larry Eugene Phillips, Jr., bank robber and leader of the High Incident Bandits
Larry Lawton, author and ex-convict
Larry Nassar, serial child molester
Larry Pusateri, American fugitive
Larry Singleton, rapist and mutilator

Multiple individuals
Larry Brown (disambiguation)
Larry Harris (disambiguation)
Larry Johnson (disambiguation)
Larry Miller (disambiguation)
Larry Murphy (disambiguation)
Larry Phillips (disambiguation)
Larry Scott (disambiguation)
Larry Smith (disambiguation)

Other
Larry Wu-Tai Chin, Chinese double agent who worked in the CIA
Larry Flynt (1942–2021), American publisher
Larry Stylinson, a name blended fandom "ship" of musicians Harry Styles and Louis Tomlinson
Larry Wijeratna (1950–1998), Sri Lankan Sinhala army major general
Lost Boy Larry, nickname for a presumed missing boy in Albuquerque, New Mexico, whose cries for help were broadcast over CB radio for several days in August 1973 (later deemed a hoax by state authorities)

Animals
Larry (cat), Chief Mouser to the Cabinet Office since February 2011

In fiction

Animation
Larry the Cucumber, character from VeggieTales; also goes by the alter-ego of Larryboy
Larry the Lobster, a fictional lifeguard on SpongeBob SquarePants
Larry Palaroncini, character from Homestar Runner that plays in the band Limozeen
Larry, an anaconda from the 2006 Disney animated film The Wild
Larry Burns (The Simpsons), the son of Mr. Burns, portrayed by Rodney Dangerfield in The Simpsons
Larry, a white mouse who appeared in two episodes of Pinky and the Brain
Lawrence "Larry", an idiotic crocodile who appears in the Pearls Before Swine comic strip

Movies and television
Doctor Laurence Erhardt, one of the original mad scientists from Mystery Science Theater 3000 TV series
 Larry, a character in the 1986 American science fiction movie Howard the Duck
 Larry, a character in the 1990 American action comedy movie Kindergarten Cop
 Larry, a character played by Christopher Lloyd in the 1983 American comedy movie Mr. Mom
 Larry, a character in the 2012 American comedy film This Is 40
 Larry, a character in the 2002 monster comedy action film Eight Legged Freaks
 Larry, a character on the American sitcom television series Newhart
 Larry Appleton, a character on the American sitcom television series Perfect Strangers, often referred to as Cousin Larry (1986–1993)
 Larry Blaisdell, character played by Larry Bagby III on Buffy the Vampire Slayer
 Lawrence "Larry" Buckman, a character in the 1989 American family comedy-drama movie Parenthood
 Larry Dallas, Jack Tripper's best friend from the ABC sitcom Three's Company (1977–1984)
 Larry Donner, a character played by Billy Crystal in the 1987 movie Throw Momma from the Train
 Larry Emdur, a host on the Morning Show, Channel 7, Australia
 Larry Fleinhardt, a character who is a theoretical physicist, cosmologist, and CalSci professor in the CBS crime drama NUMB3RS, played by Peter MacNicol
 Larry Howard, a character in the 1986 American science fiction adventure movie Flight of the Navigator
 Larry "Bud" Melman, recurring character on David Letterman shows
 Larry Potter, a character from the American TV sitcom Get a Life (1990–1992)
 Larry Sanders, titular character on the American sitcom The Larry Sanders Show (1992-1998)
 Larry Tate, on the TV series Bewitched
 Larry the cameraman, a character played Chris Elliott by in the 1993 American fantasy comedy Groundhog Day

Video games
Larry Butz, the friend of Phoenix Wright in the Ace Attorney series
 Larry "Pixy" Foulke, a fictional character in Ace Combat Zero: The Belkan War
Larry Laffer, the fictional character from the Leisure Suit Larry adult video game series
Larry Koopa, a video game character in the Super Mario Bros. series

See also
Lari (given name)
Laurence (disambiguation)
Lawrence (disambiguation)
Laurentius (disambiguation)

English masculine given names
Hypocorisms